"Lie to Me" is a song by American DJ Cole Plante from his debut EP, Colektiv. The song was produced by Plante and Myon & Shane 54. The track was released on July 30, 2013, via Beatport on Teknicole Records. The song was recorded in 2013. It reached number 1 on the Billboard Hot Dance Club Songs chart, in January 2014.

Background 
"Lie to Me" is a fast-tempo song with 128 bpm running throughout the song.

Reception 
"Lie to Me" has received very positive reception stating Plante's maturing sound is sounding better and complimenting Laroo's vocals.

See also
 List of number-one dance singles of 2014 (U.S.)

External links 
 https://web.archive.org/web/20130808081751/https://www.beatport.com/release/lie-to-me-feat-koko-laroo-extended-mix/1129244
 https://www.youtube.com/watch?v=Rum1i84Gwcs

References

2013 songs
2013 singles